WFLI-TV (channel 53) is a television station licensed to Cleveland, Tennessee, United States, serving the Chattanooga area as an affiliate of The CW and MyNetworkTV. It is owned by MPS Media, which maintains a local marketing agreement (LMA) with New Age Media, owner of True Crime Network/Comet affiliate WDSI-TV (channel 61), for the provision of certain services. Sinclair Broadcast Group, owner of dual ABC/Fox affiliate WTVC (channel 9), provides some engineering functions for both stations under LMAs and also programs WFLI-TV.

WFLI-TV and WDSI-TV share studios on East Main Street (SR 8/US 41/US 76) in Chattanooga's Highland Park section; master control and some internal operations for the two stations are based at WTVC's facilities on Benton Drive in Chattanooga. WFLI-TV's transmitter is located on Signal Mountain in the town of Walden.

Although parts of the Chattanooga market are in the Central Time Zone, all schedules are listed in Eastern Time.

History
The station signed on May 25, 1987, as an independent co-owned with WFLI radio (1070 AM) (hence the television station call sign). It aired an analog signal on UHF channel 53 from a transmitter in Cohutta, Georgia. On January 16, 1995, WFLI joined UPN as a charter affiliate. In 1997, the station was sold to Lambert Broadcasting, LLC. It added The WB in 1999 as a secondary affiliation; two years later, WFLI dropped UPN and became a full-time WB affiliate. The Meredith Corporation acquired WFLI in 2004.

Between 2001 and 2003, the station sold late-night Saturday paid programming time to an independent producer, out of which eventually arose the format and style of Fuel TV (now Fox Sports 2), which went by that name on WFLI. Fox Cable Networks eventually bought the trademarks and concept of Fuel TV in 2003 to launch it as a full-fledged cable network in July of that year, and the original Fuel TV program on WFLI ended in September 2003.

On March 7, 2006, WFLI was announced as Chattanooga's CW affiliate at the network's launch on September 18 in the wake of the merger of the WB and UPN into The CW. Meanwhile, WDSI launched a new second digital subchannel to serve as the area's MyNetworkTV affiliate beginning September 5. On November 26, 2007, Meredith announced the sale of WFLI to MPS Media which closed April 1, 2008. Shortly thereafter, New Age Media (owner of WDSI) began operation of the station through an LMA. On May 23, 2011, WFLI signed on a new second digital subchannel of its own to offer MeTV.

Sinclair Broadcast Group purchased the non-license assets of WFLI-TV and WDSI-TV from New Age Media for $1.25 million in September 2015 and began operating them under a master services agreement.

On July 28, 2021, the FCC issued a Forfeiture Order stemming from a lawsuit against MPS Media. The lawsuit, filed by AT&T, alleged that MPS Media failed to negotiate for retransmission consent in good faith for the stations. Owners of other Sinclair-managed stations, such as Deerfield Media, were also named in the lawsuit. MPS was ordered to pay a fine of $512,288.

Programming
Syndicated programming on WFLI includes Pawn Stars, 2 Broke Girls, Family Feud, and Two and a Half Men among others.

Technical information

Subchannels
The station's digital signal is multiplexed:

Analog-to-digital conversion
WFLI-TV shut down its analog signal, over UHF channel 53, on June 12, 2009, the official date in which full-power television stations in the United States transitioned from analog to digital broadcasts under federal mandate. The station's digital signal remained on its pre-transition UHF channel 42. Through the use of PSIP, digital television receivers display the station's virtual channel as its former UHF analog channel 53, which was among the high band UHF channels (52–69) that were removed from broadcasting use as a result of the transition.

References

External links

The CW affiliates
MeTV affiliates
Charge! (TV network) affiliates
Sinclair Broadcast Group
Television channels and stations established in 1987
FLI-TV
1987 establishments in Tennessee
Mass media in Bradley County, Tennessee